The 2016 FC Pune City season will be the club's third season since its establishment in 2014 and their third season in the Indian Super League. This season will also be the first in which the club is coached by Spaniard Antonio López Habas, replacing David Platt who served as head coach the previous season.

Background

After the end of the 2014 ISL season, FC Pune City parted ways with their inaugural season head coach, Franco Colomba. Soon after, David Platt, was named as the new head coach for the 2015 season. The season began for Pune City with a 3–1 victory to the Mumbai City on 5 October. The team ended the season with four wins through fourteen matches and failed to qualify for the finals but were seven points short.

Player movement

Retained players

Domestic

Signings

Indian Super League

Results summary

Matches

Player statistics

See also
 2016–17 in Indian football

References

FC Pune City seasons
Pune